María del Carmen Regueiro Lorenzo (born November 22, 1966 in  Los Teques, Venezuela) better known as Maricarmen Regueiro is a former Venezuelan actress. As of 2001, she is no longer a public figure.

Biography 
María del Carmen Regueiro Lorenzo was born on November 22, 1966 in  Los Teques, Venezuela. She daughter of Spanish parents from Galicia, who years ago came to Venezuela in search of a better future with the purpose of trying their luck in the jewelry business. She has one sister and three brothers.

Personal life 
In August 1993, her partner Ramiro Helmeyer was sentenced to 30 years in prison for allegedly being responsible for a car bomb that exploded in a Caracas shopping center. She supported him at all times until he was pardoned in 2000. In 1996 she married, Ramiro Helmeyer. In 2002, she gave birth to the couple's first child, a boy, whom they called Nicolás Helmeyer Regueiro. In 2003, she gave birth to the couple's second child, a girl, whom they called Daniela Helmeyer Regueiro. When her sister died in an accident, she took care of her nephews and assumed the role of adoptive mother.

Career 
María del Carmen Regueiro began acting in Spanish language soap operas in 1986 when she participated in Cristal and the miniseries Mansion de Luxe alongside another famous Venezuelan actor, Carlos Mata. But she toiled as a secondary soap actress until 1988, when she starred in Señora  alongside Carlos Mata, Flavio Caballero and Caridad Canelón. Señora became an instant hit all over Venezuela and other Latin American countries for producer RCTV and Regueiro became a super-star immediately. In Amanda Sabater alongside Flavio Caballero. In addition to working in Venezuelan and Peruvian productions she has also worked in Argentina.

Filmography

Television

External links
Maricarmen Regueiro at VenCOR

1966 births
Venezuelan telenovela actresses
Living people
Venezuelan people of Portuguese descent